Ancistrus greeni is a species of catfish in the family Loricariidae. It is native to South America, where it occurs in the Madre de Dios River and Inambari River basins in Peru. The species reaches 6.5 cm (2.6 inches) in total length.

References 

Fauna of Peru
Fish described in 2001
greeni